The Bhatra Sikhs (also known as Bhat Sikhs) are a sub-group within the Sikhs who originated from the bards of the time of Guru Nanak. In the 20th century publication A Glossary of the Tribes and Castes of the Punjab and North-West Frontier Province, Sir Denzil Ibbetson remarks that the Bhats claimed descent from the Brahmins. Eleanor Nesbitt and William Hewat McLeod suggested that they are a caste.

Origins
Many academics suggests that the word Bhatra is a diminutive form of the word Bhat which comes from Sanskrit meaning a "bard or panegyrist". Dharam Singh writes that in the Sikh tradition Bhatts are poets with the personal experience and vision of the spirituality of the Sikh Gurus whom they eulogize and celebrate in their verses, he suggests that Bhat is not an epithet for a learned Brahman". However the late Giani Gurdit Singh confirmed that the Bhat bards who contributed to the Guru Granth Sahib were descended from the Brahmins in his book, Bhatt Te Uhnah Di Rachna.

In the book, the Making of Sikh Scripture, Gurinder Singh Mann writes that a large number of the bards who contributed to the Guru Granth Sahib were upper-caste Hindus who came to the Sikh court in the sixteenth century in praise of the Guru and their court.

Demographics and occupation
McLeod stated that the Bhatra Sikhs have an "extremely small" population and they are from some villages of the Gurdaspur and Sialkot districts of the Punjab region.

Sikhism
McLeod claimed that the Bhatras of the Gurdaspur and Sialkot districts, traditionally, used to work as "fortune-tellers and hawkers".

Ethne K. Marenco claimed that in Punjab, after their conversion to Sikhism, several castes including the [Sikh] Bhats largely abandoned their "traditional occupation" in favor of other professions, particularly in the "industry, trade and transport" sectors. Jagtar Singh Grewal notes that the "compositions" by some Bhatra Sikhs who were in service of the Sikh Gurus were added in the Guru Granth Sahib.

Migration to the United Kingdom
Between the First and Second World War, the Bhatra Sikhs migrated to Britain. They settled mostly in Bristol, Cardiff, Glasgow, Liverpool, London, Portsmouth, Southampton and Swansea with small populations of theirs also settling in Birmingham, Edinburgh, Manchester and Nottingham. They also settled in Belfast, Northern Ireland. According to William Owen Cole, the Bhatra Sikhs were among the earliest Sikhs to arrive in Britain and they arrived as pedlars.

Nesbitt states that in the UK, the Bhatra men initially worked as "door-to-door salesmen" and later as shopkeepers and property renters. She suggests that in the recent times, they have started working in diverse fields.

After the end of the Second World War, the Bhatra Sikhs established gurdwaras in the regions where they resided.

See also
List of Sikhism-related topics
Bhat Vahis
Bhattan De Savaiye

References

Further reading
Desh Pradesh, Differentiation and Disjunction among the Sikhs in South Asian Experience in Britain (1994) ed. Roger Ballard
Roger Ballard, The Growth and Changing Character of the Sikh Presence in Britain in The South Asian Religious Diaspora in Britain, Canada, and the United States (2000), ed. Harold Coward, Raymond Brady Williams, John R Hinnells
Roger Ballard, Migration,Remittances, Economic Growth and Poverty Reduction: Reflections on the basis of South Asian Experience
R and C Ballard, The Sikhs: the development of South Asian settlements in Britain in Between Two Cultures ed. JL Watson (1977)
P Ghuman, Bhattra Sikhs in Cardiff: Family and Kinship Organization. New Community (1980) 8, 3.
Marie Gillespie, Television, Ethnicity and Cultural Change (Routledge 1995)
 Malory Nye, A Place for Our Gods: The Construction of an Edinburgh Hindu Temple Community (1995)
 Sikh settlers in Britain (includes material on caste and on "Bhattra")

External links
Bhatra.co.uk – includes unique content on the early decades in the UK – collection of photographs
Bhatra in the UK before Partition

Immigration to the United Kingdom
Punjabi tribes
Sikh communities
Social groups of Punjab, India
Social groups of Punjab, Pakistan